S Monocerotis, also known as 15 Monocerotis, is a massive multiple and variable star system located in the constellation Monoceros.  It is the brightest star in the Christmas Tree open cluster in the area catalogued as NGC 2264.

S Monocerotis is found within an open cluster and the Washington Double Star Catalog lists many companion stars. The closest and brightest is S Mon B, magnitude 7.8 and 3 arcseconds away. Designated component C is an 11th-magnitude B8V star. The cluster contains another dozen or so 9th and 10th magnitude stars and many fainter stars.

S Monocerotis A is a spectroscopic binary system with an eccentric orbit of about 112 years. Since 1943, the spectrum of this star has served as the MK standard for O7 by which other stars are classified. It is also an irregular variable star with a range of less than a tenth of a magnitude.

The distance to S Monocerotis and NGC 2264 has been derived in various ways, including dynamical parallax and isochrone fitting. These consistently give estimates of 700 - 900 parsecs, although this is double the likely distance derived from the Hipparcos parallax measurements.

References

External links
 S Monocerotis by James B. Kaler

Monoceros (constellation)
Monocerotis, 15
Irregular variables
Monocerotis, S
BD+10 1220
2456
047839
031978
O-type main-sequence stars
B-type main-sequence stars
Emission-line stars
?